The Bratsk Constituency (No.96) is a Russian legislative constituency in Irkutsk Oblast. It is located in Northern Irkutsk Oblast, anchoring in the city of Bratsk.

Members elected

Election results

1993

|-
! colspan=2 style="background-color:#E9E9E9;text-align:left;vertical-align:top;" |Candidate
! style="background-color:#E9E9E9;text-align:left;vertical-align:top;" |Party
! style="background-color:#E9E9E9;text-align:right;" |Votes
! style="background-color:#E9E9E9;text-align:right;" |%
|-
|style="background-color:"|
|align=left|Vitaly Shuba
|align=left|Independent
|
|35.24%
|-
|style="background-color:"|
|align=left|Lyudmila Lokshina
|align=left|Independent
| -
|19.83%
|-
| colspan="5" style="background-color:#E9E9E9;"|
|- style="font-weight:bold"
| colspan="3" style="text-align:left;" | Total
| 
| 100%
|-
| colspan="5" style="background-color:#E9E9E9;"|
|- style="font-weight:bold"
| colspan="4" |Source:
|
|}

1995

|-
! colspan=2 style="background-color:#E9E9E9;text-align:left;vertical-align:top;" |Candidate
! style="background-color:#E9E9E9;text-align:left;vertical-align:top;" |Party
! style="background-color:#E9E9E9;text-align:right;" |Votes
! style="background-color:#E9E9E9;text-align:right;" |%
|-
|style="background-color:"|
|align=left|Vitaly Shuba (incumbent)
|align=left|Independent
|
|27.28%
|-
|style="background-color:"|
|align=left|Nikolay Makarov
|align=left|Liberal Democratic Party
|
|17.76%
|-
|style="background-color:"|
|align=left|Vladimir Vikulov
|align=left|Independent
|
|17.10%
|-
|style="background-color:#3A46CE"|
|align=left|Vladimir Anyakin
|align=left|Democratic Choice of Russia – United Democrats
|
|6.97%
|-
|style="background-color: |
|align=left|Mikhail Skomarov
|align=left|Political Movement of Transport Workers
|
|6.80%
|-
|style="background-color: |
|align=left|Lev Ponomaryov
|align=left|Democratic Russia and Free Trade Unions
|
|4.49%
|-
|style="background-color:#000000"|
|colspan=2 |against all
|49,212
|17.96%
|-
| colspan="5" style="background-color:#E9E9E9;"|
|- style="font-weight:bold"
| colspan="3" style="text-align:left;" | Total
| 273,936
| 100%
|-
| colspan="5" style="background-color:#E9E9E9;"|
|- style="font-weight:bold"
| colspan="4" |Source:
|
|}

1999

|-
! colspan=2 style="background-color:#E9E9E9;text-align:left;vertical-align:top;" |Candidate
! style="background-color:#E9E9E9;text-align:left;vertical-align:top;" |Party
! style="background-color:#E9E9E9;text-align:right;" |Votes
! style="background-color:#E9E9E9;text-align:right;" |%
|-
|style="background-color:#3B9EDF"|
|align=left|Vitaly Shuba (incumbent)
|align=left|Fatherland – All Russia
|
|36.14%
|-
|style="background-color:"|
|align=left|Yury Purdenko
|align=left|Independent
|
|31.43%
|-
|style="background-color:"|
|align=left|Tatyana Vinogradova
|align=left|Independent
|
|12.16%
|-
|style="background-color:"|
|align=left|Boris Khramovskikh
|align=left|Independent
|
|5.76%
|-
|style="background-color:#000000"|
|colspan=2 |against all
|
|12.79%
|-
| colspan="5" style="background-color:#E9E9E9;"|
|- style="font-weight:bold"
| colspan="3" style="text-align:left;" | Total
| 
| 100%
|-
| colspan="5" style="background-color:#E9E9E9;"|
|- style="font-weight:bold"
| colspan="4" |Source:
|
|}

2003

|-
! colspan=2 style="background-color:#E9E9E9;text-align:left;vertical-align:top;" |Candidate
! style="background-color:#E9E9E9;text-align:left;vertical-align:top;" |Party
! style="background-color:#E9E9E9;text-align:right;" |Votes
! style="background-color:#E9E9E9;text-align:right;" |%
|-
|style="background-color:"|
|align=left|Vitaly Shuba (incumbent)
|align=left|United Russia
|
|54.92%
|-
|style="background-color:"|
|align=left|Aleksandr Silchenko
|align=left|Communist Party
|
|17.49%
|-
|style="background-color:"|
|align=left|Aleksandr Vechirko
|align=left|Independent
|
|6.75%
|-
|style="background-color:#00A1FF"|
|align=left|Vadim Mikhaylov
|align=left|Party of Russia's Rebirth-Russian Party of Life
|
|3.59%
|-
|style="background-color:"|
|align=left|Vyacheslav Shapovalov
|align=left|Independent
|
|2.43%
|-
|style="background-color:#000000"|
|colspan=2 |against all
|
|13.52%
|-
| colspan="5" style="background-color:#E9E9E9;"|
|- style="font-weight:bold"
| colspan="3" style="text-align:left;" | Total
| 
| 100%
|-
| colspan="5" style="background-color:#E9E9E9;"|
|- style="font-weight:bold"
| colspan="4" |Source:
|
|}

2016

|-
! colspan=2 style="background-color:#E9E9E9;text-align:left;vertical-align:top;" |Candidate
! style="background-color:#E9E9E9;text-align:left;vertical-align:top;" |Party
! style="background-color:#E9E9E9;text-align:right;" |Votes
! style="background-color:#E9E9E9;text-align:right;" |%
|-
|style="background-color:"|
|align=left|Andrey Chernyshev
|align=left|United Russia
|
|41.43%
|-
|style="background-color:"|
|align=left|Andrey Andreyev
|align=left|Communist Party
|
|23.79%
|-
|style="background-color:"|
|align=left|Georgy Lubenkov
|align=left|Liberal Democratic Party
|
|14.81%
|-
|style="background-color:"|
|align=left|Nikolay Ochkas
|align=left|Rodina
|
|3.53%
|-
|style="background:"| 
|align=left|Oleg Katasonov
|align=left|Communists of Russia
|
|2.90%
|-
|style="background:"| 
|align=left|Denis Kuchmenko
|align=left|Party of Growth
|
|2.63%
|-
|style="background:"| 
|align=left|Viktor Makarov
|align=left|Patriots of Russia
|
|2.55%
|-
|style="background:"| 
|align=left|Dmitry Belikov
|align=left|Civic Platform
|
|2.21%
|-
| colspan="5" style="background-color:#E9E9E9;"|
|- style="font-weight:bold"
| colspan="3" style="text-align:left;" | Total
| 
| 100%
|-
| colspan="5" style="background-color:#E9E9E9;"|
|- style="font-weight:bold"
| colspan="4" |Source:
|
|}

2021

|-
! colspan=2 style="background-color:#E9E9E9;text-align:left;vertical-align:top;" |Candidate
! style="background-color:#E9E9E9;text-align:left;vertical-align:top;" |Party
! style="background-color:#E9E9E9;text-align:right;" |Votes
! style="background-color:#E9E9E9;text-align:right;" |%
|-
|style="background-color:"|
|align=left|Alexander Yakubovsky
|align=left|United Russia
|
|33.61%
|-
|style="background-color:"|
|align=left|Andrey Andreyev
|align=left|Communist Party
|
|26.64%
|-
|style="background-color: " |
|align=left|Larisa Yegorova
|align=left|A Just Russia — For Truth
|
|9.62%
|-
|style="background-color:"|
|align=left|Oleg Popov
|align=left|Liberal Democratic Party
|
|7.85%
|-
|style="background-color:"|
|align=left|Alla Lagutina
|align=left|New People
|
|6.87%
|-
|style="background-color: "|
|align=left|Yevgeny Goloviznin
|align=left|Party of Pensioners
|
|5.16%
|-
|style="background-color: "|
|align=left|Sergey Nikonov
|align=left|Russian Party of Freedom and Justice
|
|2.67%
|-
|style="background-color:"|
|align=left|Tuyana Indrayeva
|align=left|Rodina
|
|2.22%
|-
|style="background:;"| 
|align=left|Oleg Yegupov
|align=left|Green Alternative
|
|1.98%
|-
|style="background: "| 
|align=left|Olga Lomanova
|align=left|The Greens
|
|1.80%
|-
|style="background: "| 
|align=left|Aleksey Tupitsin
|align=left|Yabloko
|
|1.53%
|-
|style="background: "| 
|align=left|Artem Orlov
|align=left|Party of Growth
|
|1.29%
|-
| colspan="5" style="background-color:#E9E9E9;"|
|- style="font-weight:bold"
| colspan="3" style="text-align:left;" | Total
| 
| 100%
|-
| colspan="5" style="background-color:#E9E9E9;"|
|- style="font-weight:bold"
| colspan="4" |Source:
|
|}

Notes

References

Russian legislative constituencies
Politics of Irkutsk Oblast